The Conger eel (Bathycongrus thysanochilus) is an eel in the family Congridae (conger/garden eels). It was described by Earl Desmond Reid in 1934, originally under the genus Congrina. It is a marine, deep water-dwelling eel which is known from Cuba and Venezuela, in the western central Atlantic Ocean. It dwells at a depth range of 476–659 metres.

References

thysanochilus
Fish described in 1934
Taxa named by Earl Desmond Reid